New Horizons is an anthology of science fiction stories edited by American writer August Derleth. It was released posthumously by the specialty house publisher Arkham House in a hardcover edition of 2,917 copies.  While the title page gives the date of publication as 1998, the book was not actually printed and released until 1999. The book is an anthology that Derleth had planned in the early 1960s, but never published.

Contents

New Horizons contains the following stories:

 "Introduction", by Joseph Wrzos
 Part I: Time Travel Before Tachyons
 "The Runaway Skyscraper", by Murray Leinster
 "A Dream of Armageddon", by H.G. Wells
 "Willie", by Frank Belknap Long
 "The Pureblind Prophet", by David H. Keller and Paul Spencer
 Part II: Technological Triumphs: The Light Side
 "The Feline Light and Power Company", by Jacque Morgan
 "Solander's Radio Tomb", by Ellis Parker Butler
 "The Perambulating Home", by Henry Hugh Simmons
 Part III: Global Catastrophe: Atlantean
 "Countries in the Sea", by August Derleth and Mark Schorer
 Part IV: Amazing Discoveries: The Flip Side
 "The Ultra-Elixir of Youth", by A. Hyatt Verrill
 "The Book of Worlds", by Miles J. Breuer
 "The Truth About the Psycho-tector", by Stanton A. Coblentz
 Part V: Menace from Above: Local, Interstellar
 "Raiders of the Universes", by Donald Wandrei
 "The Planet Entity", by E.M. Johnston and Clark Ashton Smith
 Appendix: August Derleth's Science Fiction Anthologies

Sources

1998 anthologies
Science fiction anthologies
Arkham House books
American anthologies